The Oromoid languages are a branch of Lowland East Cushitic languages that includes the most populous Cushitic language, Oromo, and the closely related Konsoid dialect cluster.

Oromo Oromo, Eastern Oromo, Borana, Orma, Waata
Konsoid (Konso–Gidole) Konso, Dirasha (Gidole), Bussa (Mossiya), Mashile, Turo, Gato

References 

East Cushitic languages